Raymond Douglas "Ray" Barber (born 28 February 1959) is a former Australian politician.

He was born in Waratah in New South Wales to Graham Douglas Barber, a building surveyor for local government, and Fae Aileen, née Edmonds, a high school deputy principal. He attended primary school at Orange East, Undercliffe and West Pennant Hills, and then Pennant Hills High School. The family moved to Queensland in 1973, where Barber attended Nambour State High School before studying for a Bachelor of Arts (1980) and Bachelor of Law (1983) at the University of Queensland. From 1983 he was a partner in Dobbyn & Partners, a law firm at Coolum Beach. He was also a founding member of Sunshine Coast Community Legal Service, and was involved in the local surfing community as honorary solicitor of the Sunshine branch of the Surf Lifesaving Association, treasurer of Coolum Boardriders, and a founding member of Coolum Christian Surfers.

A member of the Labor Party, Barber was elected to the Queensland Legislative Assembly in 1989 as the member for Cooroora. The seat was abolished in 1992, and Barber ran instead for the new seat of Noosa, but was defeated. In March 1993 he married Nikki Parkinson, a reporter and publicist.

At the 2012 state election, he was the unsuccessful Labor candidate for the safe Liberal National seat of Maroochydore.

References

1959 births
Living people
Australian Labor Party members of the Parliament of Queensland
Members of the Queensland Legislative Assembly